The 2015 Maya Awards (Indonesian: Piala Maya 2015) is an award ceremony honoring the best Indonesian films of 2015. The ceremony was held at Soehanna Hall, SCBD, South Jakarta, on December 19, 2015. The award ceremony is held in collaboration with the SAE Institute and Kineria.com, with the 2015 theme being "Imajinasia".

Being nominated to 14 times, Guru Bangsa: Tjokroaminoto also was biggest winner film for taking home eight trophy awards, behind Filosofi Kopi and Nada Untuk Asa were received double awards.

Nomination process
A committee of 350 independent judges makes selections from Indonesian films released in the period from December 1, 2014, to November 30, 2015. Nominations were announced on December 1, 2015. Public nominations were also made in several categories such as Short Film, Animation, and Documentary. In October and November, a selection of nominated films were screened at Film Week events at several universities.

Winners and nominees
Winners are listed first and signified in bold letters. Nominees for special awards, Iqbal Rais Award (Young Director), were announced on December 9, 2015, via Twitter official account.

Technical

Performers

Competition

Special Awards

Multiple wins and nominations
The following films received multiple awards:

The following films receive multiple nominations:

External links
Official Website

References

Maya Awards (Indonesia)
2015 film awards